The following are named after Henri Lebesgue:

Blaschke–Lebesgue theorem
Cantor–Lebesgue function
Borel–Lebesgue theorem
Fatou–Lebesgue theorem
Lebesgue constant
Lebesgue covering dimension
Lebesgue differentiation theorem
Lebesgue integration
Lebesgue measure
Infinite-dimensional Lebesgue measure
Lebesgue point
Lebesgue space
Lebesgue–Rokhlin probability space
Lebesgue–Stieltjes integration
Lebesgue–Vitali theorem
Lebesgue spine
Lebesgue's lemma
Lebesgue's decomposition theorem
Lebesgue's density theorem
Lebesgue's dominated convergence theorem
Lebesgue's number lemma
Lebesgue's universal covering problem
Riemann–Lebesgue lemma
Walsh–Lebesgue theorem

Lebesgue